A Bracewell probe is a hypothetical concept for an autonomous interstellar space probe dispatched for the express purpose of communication with one or more alien civilizations. It was proposed by Ronald N. Bracewell in a 1960 paper, as an alternative to interstellar radio communication between widely separated civilizations.

Description 
A Bracewell probe would be constructed as an autonomous robotic interstellar space probe with a high level of artificial intelligence, and all relevant information that its home civilization might wish to communicate to another culture. It would seek out technological civilizations—or alternatively monitor worlds where there is a likelihood of technological civilizations arising—and communicate over "short" distances (compared to the interstellar distances between inhabited worlds) once it discovered a civilization that meets its contact criteria. It would make its presence known, carry out a dialogue with the contacted culture, and presumably communicate the results of its encounter to its place of origin. In essence, such probes would act as an autonomous local representative of their home civilization and would act as the point of contact between the cultures.

Since a Bracewell probe can communicate much faster, over shorter distances, and over large spans of time, it can communicate with alien cultures more efficiently than radio message exchange might. The disadvantage to this approach is that such probes cannot communicate anything not in their data storage, nor can their contact criteria or policies for communication be quickly updated by their "base of operations".

While a Bracewell probe need not be a von Neumann probe as well, the two concepts are compatible, and a self-replicating device as proposed by von Neumann would greatly speed up a Bracewell probe's search for alien civilizations.

It is also possible that such a probe (or system of probes if launched as a von Neumann–Bracewell probe) may outlive the civilization which created and launched it.

There have been some efforts under the SETA and SETV projects to detect evidence for the visitation of the Solar System by such hypothetical probes, and to signal or activate such an alleged probe that may be lying dormant in local space.  Variations in the echo delay times of radio transmissions, known as long delayed echoes, or LDEs, have also been interpreted in Professor Bracewell's 1960 paper as evidence for such probes.

The near-Earth object 1991 VG was initially suggested as a candidate for a Bracewell probe due to its unusual characteristics. In more recent years, however, additional discoveries have accounted for the characteristics of 1991 VG, and it is no longer regarded as anomalous.

Fictional examples 
 In Arthur C. Clarke's novel The Fountains of Paradise the extraterrestrial Starglider probe is an example of a Bracewell probe. In Clarke's story "The Sentinel", later adapted into the film 2001: A Space Odyssey, the 'Monolith' appears to be a Bracewell probe placed on the moon to ensure that only a civilization capable of spaceflight would be able to discover it.
 Alien Planet is a 94-minute special which aired on the Discovery Channel in 2005 about two internationally-built robot probes, and their mothership, searching for alien life on the fictional planet Darwin IV.
 Bracewell probes are featured in David Brin's 2012 novel Existence.
 In Star Trek: The Motion Picture, a Voyager-class probe was upgraded and repurposed by an alien civilization. It acquired so much information, it became conscious and returned "home" to share what it learned
 In the Star Trek: The Next Generation episode "The Inner Light", a Bracewell probe transmits details of an extinct civilization to Captain Picard.
 In the Star Trek: Voyager episode "Friendship One", the crew is tasked with recovering a Bracewell probe that humans launched and find it on a planet whose inhabitants used the knowledge they obtained from it with disastrous results.
 An alien probe contacts the space station Babylon 5 in the season 3 episode "A Day in the Strife". The probe disguises itself as a Bracewell probe, asking a series of questions and offering new technologies, medicine and science in return for answers to said questions. However, it's discovered that the probe was actually a berserker probe that would destroy any civilization that gave it correct answers by detonating an internal 500 megaton warhead. 
 The Snark, an alien probe that visits Earth in the novel In the Ocean of Night (1977) by Gregory Benford.
 Bracewell probes in the role-playing game Eclipse Phase infect the seed AIs created by humanity with a deadly computer virus.
 In the Doctor Who episode "Victory of the Daleks", the Daleks create a Bracewell probe in the form of a convincingly human android (appropriately named Bracewell) and covertly send it to Earth during World War II in order to communicate a false cover story to humans that disguises the Daleks' own arrival.

See also
 Fermi paradox
 Interstellar probe
 Self-replicating spacecraft

References 

 Reprinted in

External links 
Biographical entry for Ronald Bracewell at The Encyclopedia of Astrobiology, Astronomy, and Spaceflight
Bracewell probes, also at The Encyclopedia of Astrobiology, Astronomy, and Spaceflight
SETV projects

Hypothetical spacecraft
Interstellar messages
Search for extraterrestrial intelligence
Interstellar travel
1960 in science